Moon Girl is a fictional character published by EC Comics from 1947 to 1949. Moon Girl is a character from the Golden Age of Comic Books and has since passed into the public domain. Her secret identity is Claire Lune, a junior high history teacher.

Like DC Comics' Wonder Woman, Moon Girl was the princess of an isolated tribe of warrior women in Samarkand, and fought evil in her telepathically controlled flying moonship. Her powers derived from a moon rock. Her love interest was Prince Mengu, who tried to invade her kingdom in Samarkand, but became her companion and fellow teacher in America.

Publication history
The character was created by Bill Woolfolk and Sheldon Moldoff, and first appeared in fall 1947's The Happy Houlihans #1. After that appearance, the character was immediately spun off into her own comic, Moon Girl and the Prince.

The original EC Moon Girl title went through a number of name changes (and a final genre change) as explained by Mark James Estren in his A History of Underground Comics:

Moon Girl and the Prince lasted a single issue (fall 1947), and ran as  Moon Girl for issues #2–6. It became Moon Girl Fights Crime! for two issues, before concluding its run as A Moon, a Girl...Romance with issues #9–12. Moon Girl appears only in the story "I Was a Heart Pirate" in issue #9 (Sept-Oct 1949) and in no subsequent issue. The series continued as Weird Fantasy beginning with issue #13.

The Moon Girl story is one of two credited with starting the trend in horror comics at EC.

In 2010, Moon Girl was revived as a comiXology title by Tony Trov, Johnny Zito and Rahzzah. This new story was then published in printed form as a five-part comic book series by Red 5 Comics starting in May 2011. It depicted Claire Lune as a foreign princess living in the United States. This iteration of the character had powers granted by a moon rock.

References

External links

Moon Girl at the International Catalogue of Superheroes
Moon Girl at Comic Vine

1947 comics debuts
2000s webcomics
American superheroes
Female superheroes
Characters created by Gardner Fox
Characters created by Sheldon Moldoff
Comics about women
Comics characters introduced in 1947
EC Comics publications
Female characters in comics
Fictional immigrants to the United States
Fictional princesses
Golden Age superheroes
Public domain comics
Superhero comics